Harriet Lummis Smith (November 29, 1866 – May 9, 1947) was an American novelist and the first Black teacher in Boston Public Schools.

Early life and education
Harriet Lummis was born in Auburndale, Massachusetts, on November 29, 1866. Her father, Henry Lummis, was a clergyman. Her mother was Jennie Brewster. Smith had a half-brother, Charles Fletcher Lummis, by a previous marriage of her father. Her parents moved to Sheboygan, Wisconsin, where her father accepted a teaching post at Lawrence College. She attended the University of Wisconsin and graduated in 1886.

Career 
In 1890, she became Boston Public Schools first Black teacher where she taught mathematics and Latin in Boston Public Schools until 1917 before turning to writing full time after a publisher said she was "wasting her time teaching." She began writing for newspapers and magazines as a young woman. Due to the popularity of the Pollyanna series by Eleanor Porter her publisher recruited Smith to continue the series after Porter's death. She wrote four more books for the series with such titles as Pollyanna of the Orange Blossoms and Pollyanna's Debt of Honor. None of the books achieved the same popularity as Porter's work and all have since gone out of print.

She was a member of the Woman's Literary Club of Baltimore and was made president in 1915. She married William M. Smith in 1905. She lived in Chicago, Baltimore and eventually Philadelphia, where she died in 1947.

Works
 The Reputation of the Bella B., (1909)
Peggy Raymond's Success; or, The Girls Of Friendly Terrace (1912)
 Peggy Raymond's Vacation; or, Friendly Terrace Transplanted, (1913)
 Other People's Business: The Romantic Career of the Practical Miss Dale, (1916)
Peggy Raymond At 'The Poplars''' (1920)Agatha's Aunt (1920)Peggy Raymond's Way; or, Blossom Time At Friendly Terrace (1922)
 Pollyanna Of The Orange Blossoms (1924) Pollyanna's Jewels, (1925) Pollyanna's Debt Of Honor, (1927) Pollyanna's Western Adventure, (1929) The Uncertain Glory Pat And Pal Peggy Raymond's School Days; or, Old Girls And NewPeggy Raymond's Friendly Terrace Quartette''

References

External links
 
 

1866 births
1947 deaths
20th-century American novelists
American women novelists
Writers from Newton, Massachusetts
20th-century American women writers